Hakan Demir (born November 24, 1968 in Elazığ, Turkey) is a Turkish professional basketball coach. He is currently the head coach of the Manisa BB of the Turkish Basketbol Süper Ligi.

References

1968 births
Living people
Banvit B.K. coaches
Basketbol Süper Ligi head coaches
Beşiktaş basketball coaches
Karşıyaka basketball coaches
People from Elazığ
Tofaş S.K. coaches
Turkish basketball coaches